(German for Dreams of Love) is a set of three solo piano works (S.541/R.211) by Franz Liszt, published in 1850. Originally the three  were conceived as lieder after poems by Ludwig Uhland and Ferdinand Freiligrath. In 1850, two versions appeared simultaneously as a set of songs for high voice and piano, and as transcriptions for piano two-hands.

The two poems by Uhland and the one by Freiligrath depict three different forms of love. Uhland's "" (exalted love) is saintly or religious love: the "martyr" renounces worldly love and "heaven has opened its gates". The second song "" (blessed death) is often known by its first line ("", "I had died"), and evokes erotic love; ("I was dead from love's bliss; I lay buried in her arms; I was wakened by her kisses; I saw heaven in her eyes"). Freiligrath's poem for the third nocturne is about unconditional mature love ("Love as long as you can!", "O lieb, so lang du lieben kannst").

Liebestraum No. 3

Liebestraum No. 3 in A-flat major is the last of the three that Liszt wrote and the most popular.

It can be considered as split into three sections, each divided by a fast cadenza requiring dexterous finger work and a very high degree of technical ability.

The same melody is used throughout the piece, each time varied, especially near the middle of the work, where the climax is reached. In that section, the melody is played by a series of octaves, followed by arpeggios. A sample of this melody from the opening bars, adapted from the first edition engraving (1850), is as follows:

References

External links
 
 Sheet music of Liebestraum No.3 on Cantorion.org
 MIDIs from Piano Rolls. Real recordings by Otto Higel, Leo Ornstein, Josef Lhevinne, Eugene d'Albert, Katsuhiro Oguri
 Liebesträume: 3 Notturnos, various recordings
 Recording of Number 3 in A-flat performed by the pianist Alberto Cobo
 "Freiligrath – 'O lieb, so lang du lieben kannst' " by Scott Horton, 8 November 2009, Harper's Magazine

Compositions by Franz Liszt
Compositions for solo piano
1850 compositions
Adaptations of works by Ludwig Uhland